Flourish may refer to:

 Flourish (film), a 2006 comedic thriller
 Flourish (fanfare), a ceremonial music passage
 Flourishing, the state of positive social functioning
 Flourish of approval, a symbol used for grading and correcting work 
 Card flourish, a showy movement of playing cards
 A decorative curl in typography or handwriting, such as a swash

See also
 Floruit ("they flourished"), the period during which a person was known to have been active